The men's Over 94 kg (+206.8 lbs) Semi-Contact category at the  W.A.K.O. World Championships 2007 in Coimbra was the heaviest of the male Semi-Contact tournaments with super heavyweight being the nearest equivalent when compared to Full-Contact's weight classes.  There were thirteen fighters from three continents (Europe, Africa and North America) taking part in the competition.  Each of the matches was three rounds of two minutes each and were fought under Semi-Contact rules.

Due to the fact there were too few men for a tournament intended for sixteen, three of the fighters received byes through to the quarter final stage.  The tournament winner was Italy's Marco Culiersi who defeated Ireland's Andy Hogan by points decision in the final to claim gold.  Belgrade '07 Light-Contact bronze medalist Ranis Smajlovic from Slovenia won another bronze medal as did Lee Matthews from Great Britain.

Results

Key

See also 
 List of WAKO Amateur World Championships
 List of WAKO Amateur European Championships
 List of male kickboxers

References

External links 
 WAKO World Association of Kickboxing Organizations Official Site

Kickboxing events at the WAKO World Championships 2007 Coimbra
2007 in kickboxing
Kickboxing in Portugal